Hraběšín is a municipality and village in Kutná Hora District in the Central Bohemian Region of the Czech Republic. It has about 100 inhabitants.

Geography
It lies in the Upper Sázava Hills. It is situated between the streams Paběnický and Klejnárka, which form the western and eastern municipal border. A minor watercourse supplies two small ponds in the centre of the village.

History
The village was founded in the 14th century and named after the nobleman Hrabiše of Paběnice. The first written mention of Hraběšín is from 1379. From 1658 to 1783, it was owned by the Sedlec Abbey. In 1819, it was acquired by the House of Schwarzenberg.

Sights
The main sight is the Hraběšice Castle. The Baroque castle complex includes the castle, a chapel, and outbuildings, surrounded by a wall. The castle was built in the early 17th century, and completely rebuilt in the 1740s. The Chapel of Saint Florian and outbuildings were added in the firsth half of the 19th century. In 1992, the castle was returned in restitution to Karel Schwarzenberg.

References

External links

Villages in Kutná Hora District